Thermal pad can have the following meanings:
 Sleeping pad, a thin layer of insulating material placed under a hiker's sleeping bag
 Thermally conductive pad, a pad made of heat-conducting material applied to a heatsink
 Thermal relief, a pad on a printed circuit board connected to surrounding copper with a thermal connection